This is a list of boroughs of the city of Kristiansand which makes up a large part of the municipality of Kristiansand which is located in Agder county, Norway.  The city is divided into 5 boroughs and each borough is further divided into several districts.  In total, there are 18 districts in the city.

References

Kristiansand